The 2022 Manly Warringah Sea Eagles season was the 73rd in the clubs history since their entry to the New South Wales Rugby League premiership in 1947. Des Hasler coached the club for the fourth consecutive year and twelfth overall. Daly Cherry-Evans captained the club for the sixth consecutive year. Pointsbet became the new major sponsor for the club taking over URM who moved onto a premier partner role.  The season was notable for an incident when seven players boycotted the round 20 match against the Sydney Roosters due to their refusal to wear the club's "pride" jersey.

Brookvale Oval Upgrade 

A new 3000 seat grandstand on the Northern end of the ground opened to spectators in March 2022. It will provide training facilities for players as well. With the new grandstand and no COVID-19 restrictions, the ground returned back to full capacity for the first time since Round 1, 2020.

2022 Squad

Transfers 

Re-Signed Players:

Morgan Boyle (2022), Lachlan Croker (2023), Reuben Garrick (2023), Morgan Harper (2023), Sean Keppie (2024), Haumole Olakau'atu (2024), Brad Parker (2023), Josh Schuster (2024), Toafofoa Sipley (2023), Jorge Taufua (2022), Dylan Walker (2022)

Results 

Pre-Season

Source: 

Regular Season

Source:

Representative Players 
 Josh Aloiai ( Samoa)
 Daly Cherry-Evans ( Queensland Maroons,  Prime Minister's XIII,  Australia)
 Kieran Foran ( New Zealand)
 Morgan Harper ( Māori All Stars)
 Toluta'u Koula ( Tonga)
 Haumole Olakau'atu ( Tonga)
 Taniela Paseka ( Tonga)
 James Roumanos ( Lebanon)
 Josh Schuster ( Samoa)
 Pio Seci ( Fiji)
 Toafofoa Sipley ( Samoa)
 Martin Taupau ( Samoa)
 Jake Trbojevic ( New South Wales Blues,  Australia)
 Christian Tuipulotu ( Tonga)
 Dylan Walker ( Māori All Stars)

Club Awards 

 Roy Bull Best and Fairest: Lachlan Croker
 Players' Player: Kieran Foran
 Ken Arthurson Rising Star: Toluta'u Koula
 Menzies Medal: Lachlan Croker
 Gordon Willougby Medal (best player voted by members): Daly Cherry-Evans
 Leading Point Scorer: Reuben Garrick
 Leading Try Scorer: Reuben Garrick
 NRL Club Community Award: Sean Keppie

References

Manly Warringah Sea Eagles seasons
Manly